B. cornutus may refer to:

 Barbicambarus cornutus, a crayfish species
 Batrachostomus cornutus, a bird species
 Bombus cornutus, a bumblebee species
 Bostrychoplites cornutus, a beetle species

See also
 Cornutus (disambiguation)